Richard Lee "Dick" Schmalensee (born 1944) is the Howard W. Johnson Professor of Management, Emeritus at the MIT Sloan School of Management.  He is also Professor of Economics, Emeritus, at the Department of Economics at MIT. He served as the John C Head III Dean of the MIT Sloan School of Management from 1998 through 2007. He was a member of the President's Council of Economic Advisers from 1989 through 1991 and served for 12 years as Director of the MIT Center for Energy and Environmental Policy Research.

Schmalensee received his S.B. and Ph.D. in Economics from MIT.

Bibliography

References

External links
MIT faculty directory listing

1944 births
MIT School of Humanities, Arts, and Social Sciences alumni
Living people
21st-century American economists
MIT Sloan School of Management faculty
Fellows of the Econometric Society
Fellows of the American Academy of Arts and Sciences
United States Council of Economic Advisers
MIT School of Humanities, Arts, and Social Sciences faculty